Uritskoye is a rural locality (a village) in Zelentsovskoye Rural Settlement, Nikolsky District, Vologda Oblast, Russia. The population was 35 as of 2002.

Geography 
Uritskoye is located 63 km northwest of Nikolsk (the district's administrative centre) by road. Shirokaya is the nearest rural locality.

References 

Rural localities in Nikolsky District, Vologda Oblast